Titus Peak, at  above sea level is the seventh highest peak in the Smoky Mountains of Idaho. The peak is located in Sawtooth National Recreation Area in Blaine County. No roads or trails go to the summit.

References 

Mountains of Idaho
Mountains of Blaine County, Idaho
Sawtooth National Forest